Operation Peristera ("dove" in Greek) was a military campaign for control of the Peloponnese peninsula in southern Greece during the Greek Civil War.

Background
In early 1947, the Peloponnese peninsula was relatively peaceful, but fighting eventually occurred in late 1947. Throughout 1948, communist control of the interior of the peninsula made the central and southern regions inaccessible to government. The communists provided good treatment to the local inhabitants in areas they controlled, and the region suffered less than other parts of Greece.

Campaign
The location of the Peloponnese isolated the communists there from their comrades in northern and central Greece. During the course of the campaign, the communist leadership (operating in northern Greece) suffered a split between those loyal to Markos Vafiadis and the pro-Soviet faction of KKE General-Secretary Nikos Zachariadis, as a result of the Tito–Stalin split. At the same time, relations between the Greek communists and Tito's Yugoslavia were beginning to break down.

Bibliography

Studies in the History of the Greek Civil War, 1945–1949. Lars Bærentzen, John O. Iatrides, Ole Langwitz Smith. 1987.

1948 in Greece
1949 in Greece
Conflicts in 1948
Conflicts in 1949
Peristera
Modern history of the Peloponnese